Hapleginella is a genus of flies in the family Chloropidae.

References 

 Europe
 Nearctic

Oscinellinae
Chloropidae genera